is a Japanese doctor and politician serving in the House of Representatives in the Diet (national legislature) as a member of the Liberal Democratic Party. A native of Osaka he received a Ph.D in medicine from Osaka Medical College in 1960 for the study of infantile paralysis. After serving in the assembly of Osaka Prefecture he was elected to the Diet for the first time in 1968 as a member of the House of Councilors and to the House of Representatives for the first time in 1986. From 1989 to 1990 he served as Minister for Foreign Affairs in Toshiki Kaifu's cabinet (1989–1991).

Nakayama's parents, Fukuzō and Masa, were also politicians and members of the Diet, as are his brother Masaaki and nephew Yasuhide.

Nakayama also made history by hiring the first non-Japanese aide, Timothy Langley, into the Japanese Diet as was showcased on 60 Minutes.

Nakayama is affiliated to the openly revisionist organization Nippon Kaigi. He was a mentor to Nippon Ishin no Kai politician Nobuyuki Baba.

References 
Notes

Sources

External links 
 

|-

|-

|-

|-

|-

1924 births
Living people
People from Osaka
20th-century Japanese physicians
Members of the House of Councillors (Japan)
Members of the House of Representatives (Japan)
Government ministers of Japan
Foreign ministers of Japan
Liberal Democratic Party (Japan) politicians
Recipients of the Padma Shri in public affairs
Members of Nippon Kaigi
21st-century Japanese politicians